The Super Inframan (translated literally as Chinese Superman) is a 1975 Hong Kong science fiction action film produced by Shaw Brothers Studio in 1975. Inspired by the huge success of the Japanese tokusatsu franchises such as Ultraman and Kamen Rider in Hong Kong, this film features the same type of "henshin"/transformation, monster/robot action and costumed heroics, coupled with Chinese kung fu action.

Plot
In 2015, Demon Princess Elzebub (also translated as Princess Dragon Mom) awakens from 10 million years of dormancy and plots to conquer the Earth. She destroys a few major cities in China to prove her power to humanity, who react in shock. Returning to her lair in Inner-Earth, she awakens her army of Skeleton Ghosts and various mutant humanoids to wreak havoc on the surface.

The head of the Science Headquarters, Professor Liu Ying-de, has completed the BDX Project, a potential countermeasure against Elzebub. In the HQ's secret laboratory, he transforms Lei Ma, a high-ranking SH officer, into the bionic kung fu superhero Inframan. The solar-powered red & silver armored Inframan has both enhanced strength and combat weapons.
 
Once Inframan destroys the princess's various monsters, she decides to steal the professor's blueprints of Inframan in hope of discovering his weakness. Meanwhile, the professor introduces Thunderball Fists, gloves capable of destroying any substance known to man, as well as covering up Inframan's weakness. The princess decides to coerce the professor. Capturing the professor's daughter, the princess blackmails the professor into creating an Inframan for her. The professor agrees to go to Mount Devil for a meeting. When the professor refuses to make another Inframan, he and his daughter are frozen. Inframan and the Science Patrol decide to rescue both which leads to the climactic battle between Inframan and Demon Princess Elzebub.

Powers of Inframan
Lei Ma throws his arms into a Kamen Rider-like "henshin"/transforming pose, and says:
"Change! Inframan!" (變！超人) (Mandarin: "Bian! Chao Ren", Cantonese: "Bin! Chiu Yan")

His powers and attacks are (Mandarin/Cantonese):
噴火彈 (Pen Huo Dan/Pan Fo Daan) Erupting Bullet(s)
The missiles stored below Inframan's ribs. He throws them like darts, and they can also thaw him out when he is frozen.
太陽甲 (Tai Yang Jia/Taai Yeung Gaap) Solar Armor (a.k.a.: Sun Ja)
The stream of light that Inframan shoots from his wrists when crossing them together like Ultraman's Spacium Light Ray.
追魂腿 (Zhui Hun Tui/Jeui Wan Teui) Guided Kick (literally "Chase Soul Leg")
Inframan's kick attack. This can also locate its targeted enemy like a guided missile.
能量發揮 (Neng Liang Fa Hui/Nang Leung Faat Fai) Capacity Transmission (literally "Energy Emission")
Inframan activates his backup power source, in case of lack of solar power.
閃電拳 (Shan Dian Quan/Sim Din Kyun) Flashing Thunder Fists (a.k.a.: Thunder Fists, Thunderball Fists)
Later attachments for Inframan; shiny black and metallic gloves that go over his regular ones. They also shoot right off his fists and retract again, much like Mazinger Z's Rocket Punch. They also have the following weapons:
死光刀 (Si Guang Dao/Sei Gwong Dou) Deadly Light Blades
The red moon-shaped energy blades that stream from the Flashing Thunder Fists.
雷電光 (Lei Dian Guang/Leui Din Gwong) Thunder and Lightning Aura
Like the Solar Armor, but more powerful.
Inframan also has the power to grow to gigantic size, similar to Ultraman's power to change size.

Cast

Protagonists
 Lei Ma/Inframan (雷馬/中國超人) The hero. Played by Danny Lee
 Professor Liu Ying-de (劉英徳) Proprietor of Science Headquarters and the creator of Inframan. Played by Wang Hsieh
 Liu Mei-mei (美美) The Professor's daughter. Played by Yuan Man-tzu
 Xiao Hu (小虎) Mei Mei's younger brother. Played by Lu Sheng
 Lin-lin (琳琳) Mei Mei's little sister. Played by Fanny Leung
 Zhu Qi-quang (朱啓光) The lieutenant of Science Headquarters. Played by Kong Yeung
 Lu Xiao-long (呂小龍) The sergeant of Science Headquarters and a tough fighter. Played by Bruce Le
 Zhu Ming (祝明) The awkward member of Science Headquarters, who is captured and turned by Elzebub into an evil spy. Played by Lin Wen-wei

Antagonists
Demon Princess Elzebub (冰河魔主) The main villainess, ruler of Inner-Earth. Her name is a play on "Beelzebub". She is armed with a whip, and can turn into a winged dragon-like creature. In the U.S. English dubbed version, she is called Princess Dragon Mom. Played by Terry Liu
Witch-Eye (電眼魔女) Elzebub's beautiful-but-deadly servant. Has a horned helmet and eyes on her palms that shoot green beams (hypnotic or destructive). In the U.S. English dubbed version, she is called She-Demon. Played by Dana Shum
Skeleton Ghosts (白骨幽靈) Rank-and-file henchmen of the Glacier Empire. They dress in black-on-white suits with a skeleton motif, and with horned helmets. They also carry explosive metal spears.

Ice Monsters (冰河怪獸)
Fire Dragon (噴火龍) A scaly-skinned reptilian humanoid spouting a large horned crown and mustache that shoots fire from his mouth.
Spider Monster (蜘蛛怪) A fat red spider creature that shoots web-bombs and acid from its mouth and grows to gigantic size.
Plant Monster (植物怪) A teal vine-like monster that plants itself into the ground and grows into giant killer vines.
Mutant Drill (穿山怪) A horned blue mole-like monster with a drill for a hand and a shovel-like claw for another.
Long-Haired Monster (長髮怪) A red-skinned witch-like demon with long white hair and huge horns that shoot yellow beams from both its horns and hands.
Iron Armor Monsters (鐵甲怪) Two mechanical knight-like monsters, whose heads and right hands spring forth (with coils) to strike their enemy and retract again.

Production 
The film was directed by Hua Shan, written by science fiction writer Ni Kuang, produced by Runme Shaw and the cinematography was by Tadashi Nishimoto. There was also assistance from Japan; music from Ultra Seven (1967) and Mirrorman (1971) (both composed by Toru Fuyuki) is used in this film and the Inframan/Science Headquarters/monster costumes were provided by Ekisu Productions, which had done costumes for many Toei superhero TV shows of the same period. The film also starred Danny Lee as the superhero himself, and Bruceploitation star Bruce Le in a supporting role (he still got to display some of his martial arts skills in many scenes of the film).

The following year, Joseph Brenner brought this film to the U.S., and re-titled it simply Infra-Man (or Inframan), with the advertising campaign slogan "The Man Beyond Bionics!" attempting to capitalize upon The Six Million Dollar Man'''s success on American network television at the time.
This film also has some historical importance as the first superhero film set in Hong Kong, the first film promotion in Hong Kong using a hot air balloon, and the first Shaw Brothers production using a storyboard.

In 2004, the film was released on DVD in Japan and Hong Kong.

Reception
Roger Ebert, on his 7 March 1976 review for the Chicago Sun-Times, gave the film two and a half stars out of four, concluding "The movie even looks good: It's a classy, slick production by the Shaw Brothers, the Hong Kong kung fu kings. When they stop making movies like Infra-Man, a little light will go out of the world."  Infra-Man has a perfect aggregated  score of 100% based on six critic reviews on Rotten Tomatoes.

On 30 April 1999, after Quentin Tarantino re-released Mighty Peking Man in North America, Ebert upgraded his rating for the film to three stars, explaining that "I find to my astonishment that I gave Infra-Man only two and a half stars when I reviewed it. That was 22 years ago, but a fellow will remember a lot of things you wouldn't think he'd remember. I'll bet a month hasn't gone by since that I haven't thought of that film. I am awarding Mighty Peking Man three stars, for general goofiness and a certain level of insane genius, but I cannot in good conscience rate it higher than Infra-Man. So, in answer to those correspondents who ask if I have ever changed a rating on a movie: Yes, Infra-Man moves up to three stars." The original review of the film as re-posted on Ebert's website accordingly gives the film three stars.

Versions
The film was released on VHS under both Prism Entertainment and Goodtimes Entertainment. In the Goodtimes Home Video version of the American opening credits, an additional section was added in between the title and the cast and crew from the Prism version, giving the film the subtitle "Battles The Sci-Fi Monsters" in an attempt to appeal more to fans of that titular genre.  In this additional but misleading sequence, short snippets from the film are used to introduce and inaccurately name the villains of the film, with some villain characters cut out entirely.

Influence
Elements from the film influenced the 2017 revival of Mystery Science Theater 3000''.  Producer Joel Hodgson explained in an interview that Princess Dragon Mom was one of the influences for the mad scientist Kinga Forrester and that the skeleton-like Henchmen influenced the boneheads, including The Skeleton Crew Band.

References

External links
 
 
 
 

1975 films
1970s science fiction action films
1975 martial arts films
1970s superhero films
1970s Cantonese-language films
Films shot in Hong Kong
Hong Kong martial arts films
Hong Kong science fiction action films
Hong Kong superhero films
Kung fu films
Martial arts science fiction films
Shaw Brothers Studio films
Tokusatsu films
Kaiju films
Films about princesses
Films set in 2015
1970s Japanese films
1970s Hong Kong films